Beatrice "Binnie" Mary Hale-Monro (22 May 1899 – 10 January 1984) was an English actress, singer and dancer. She was one of the most successful musical theatre stars in London in the 1920s and 1930s, able to sing leading roles in operetta as well as musicals, and she was popular as a principal boy in pantomime. Her best-remembered roles were in the musicals No, No, Nanette (1925) and Mr. Cinders (1929), in which she sang "Spread a Little Happiness".

In the 1930s she also pursued a film career and later had a radio show together with her brother Sonnie Hale.  She continued to act and sing on stage through the 1950s.

Life and career
Hale was born in Liverpool. Her father, Robert Hale, and younger brother, Sonnie Hale, were actors.

Hale was one of the most successful stars in London in the 1920s and 1930s, known for her vivacity, and able to sing leading roles in operetta as well as musicals and revue. She debuted in 1916 in three productions: the musical comedy Follow the Crowd, followed by the revue We’re All In It, both at the old Empire Theatre, and in the small role of Annette in the musical Houp La! at the newly opened St. Martin's Theatre. After this, she played in several revues and musical comedies, including 150 Pound Revue (1917), Charlotte in The Kiss Call (1919), Just Fancy and Jumble Sale (1920), Betty in My Nieces (1921), Helen in the London production of Katinka (1923), Puppets and The Odd Spot (both 1924). In 1924, she married the English actor Jack Raine, with whom she had appeared in The Dippers, by Ben Travers in 1922 and in The Odd Spot. They had a daughter, Patricia, born in 1930. The marriage ended in divorce about 1934.

She finally starred in the title role of a hit musical, No, No, Nanette, in 1925 at the Palace Theatre. She also played the title role in the London production of Sunny (1926).  She began her film career in 1927 in the short film On with the Dance, with Leslie Henson and her brother. She was Jill in the long-running British musical Mr. Cinders (1929). Her recording of the song "Spread a Little Happiness" from that musical is possibly her best remembered recording. Mr. Cinders was the first of three shows in which she appeared with Bobby Howes. Next, she starred in the title role of Nippy (1930); in Bow Bells, together with her father (1932); and The Dubarry as Jeanne (1932 UK tour).

From 1933 to 1937, Hale made five films. On stage during these years, she played Peggy in Give Me a Ring (1933), Sally in Yes, Madam? (1934, with Howes, who later starred in the film version), Anne in Rise and Shine (1936), and Cochran's Coronation revue Home and Beauty (1937). In 1937, she starred as Roszi in Magyar Melody. In the 1940s, and through most of the 1950s, she played as the principal boy in pantomimes and appeared in and variety shows, musicals such as Up and Doing (1940) and Flying Colours (1941), and revues such as One, Two, Three! (1947, with her brother Sonnie) and Four, Five, Six! (1948, with Howes). She was in Out of this World (1950, Frankie Howerd's debut), and The Punch Revue (1955). She and her brother also had a radio series, All Hale.  In her last West End role, she played the Duchess and Queen of Hearts in Alice In Wonderland at the Winter Garden Theatre (1959).

She died at the age of 84 in Hastings, East Sussex.

Films
On with the Dance (1927) 
This is the Life (1933) – Sarah Tuttle
Hyde Park Corner (1935)  – Sophie
The Phantom Light (1935) – Alice Bright
Take a Chance (1937) – Wilhelmina ("Bill") Ryde
Love from a Stranger (1937) aka A Night of Terror (USA) – Kate Meadows
Magyar Melody (1939) (TV) – Roszi Belvary
One, Two, Three! (1948) (TV)

Selected stage roles
Houp La! (1916) at St Martin's Theatre with Gertie Millar
No, No, Nanette (1925) at the Palace Theatre
Sunny (1926)
Mr. Cinders (1929) at the London Hippodrome with Bobby Howes
Nippy (1930) at the Golders Green Hippodrome.
Give Me a Ring (1933) at the London Hippodrome
Yes Madam? (1934) at the London Hippodrome, with Howes
Jack and the Beanstalk (1935) – Pantomime, Theatre Royal, Drury Lane
Flying Colours (1943) at the Lyric Theatre, London
Four, Five, Six (1948) with Howes
 Out of this World (1950) at the London Palladium  with Frankie Howerd
Peggy Ryan and Ray McDonald (1950) at the Empire Theatre Newcastle
 The Punch Review (1955) at the Duke of York's Theatre, London with Alfie Bass

Discography
No, No, Nanette (1925)
Who? (1926) with Jack Buchanan, from the musical Sunny
I'm a One Man Girl (1929) with Bobby Howes, and Al Starita and his Novelty Orchestra
Spread a Little Happiness (1929) from the musical Mr. Cinders
The Debonnaire (date unknown) - with Jack Buchanan and Elsie Randolph
As Time Goes By (1932) with the Savoy Orpheans and Carroll Gibbons, piano
You're Blasé (1932) from the revue Bow Bells
Yes Madam? (1934) with Bobby Howes
You Don't Know the Half of It (1935) from the film Hyde Park Corner
A Nice Cup of Tea (1937) from the revue Home and Beauty by A.P. Herbert (lyrics) and Henry Sullivan (music)

Hale made many other recordings between 1925 and 1941, the majority of which were for the Columbia label in London.

References

External links

Hale at the National Portrait Gallery
 Binnie Hale information at the Theatre Collection, University of Bristol
 Binnie Hale Pictures

1899 births
1984 deaths
English film actresses
English musical theatre actresses
Actresses from Liverpool
Musicians from Liverpool
20th-century English actresses
20th-century English singers
20th-century English women singers